Dear Darling may refer to:

 "Dear Darling", song by Asami Imai
 "Dear Darling", song by Mary Margaret O'Hara from Miss America (later covered by The Walkabouts for Satisfied Mind)
 "Dear Darling (I Won't Be Comin' Home)", song by Ronnie James Dio
 "Dear Darling (I'll Be There)", song Dennis DeYoung from Desert Moon

See also
 "Dear Darlin'", song by Olly Murs
 Darling Dear (disambiguation)